Pamirioceras is an extinct genus of ammonites in the monotypic Adrianitidae subfamily Pamiritellinae.   They are an extinct group of ammonoid, which are shelled cephalopods related to squids, belemnites, octopuses, and cuttlefish, and more distantly to the nautiloids.

References

 The Paleobiology Database accessed on 10/01/07

Goniatitida genera
Adrianitidae